() is a sub-officer rank used by some units of the French Armed Forces. It is traditionally a cavalry unit rank. There are three distinct ranks of maréchal des logis, which are generally the equivalents of sergeant ranks (although they generally have less responsibility than a British or Commonwealth sergeant).

 Maréchal des logis-chef (equivalent to sergent-chef).  This is a superior rank to maréchal des logis and wears three chevrons, gold or silver.

 Maréchal des logis de carrière (equivalent to sergent). Wears two chevrons. A maréchal des logis is shortened to "margis".

 Maréchal des logis sous contrat. Wears one chevron. This rank is increasingly uncommon in the French military since the end of conscription.

The maréchal des logis usually commands a section, tank, or gun, and therefore corresponds approximately to the British or Commonwealth rank of corporal, the U.S. Army rank of staff sergeant, or the U.S. Marine Corps rank of sergeant.

The rank of maréchal des logis is used by the armoured cavalry, the artillery, the materiel, the commissary and the transport corps, all of the French Army, and by the Gendarmerie Nationale.

The term logistics is derived from maréchal des logis'', by Antoine-Henri Jomini.

Notes

References

Military ranks of France
fr:Maréchal des logis (Gendarmerie française)